Expeditie Robinson 2021 is the twenty-second season of the Dutch reality television series Expeditie Robinson.  Due to the COVID-19 pandemic, the season changed filming locations and filmed in Dugi Otok, Croatia. As with the previous seasons since 2010 (with the exception of the previous season), famous Dutch celebrities will be competing in teams to survive against each other and elimination. The main twist this season is 8 former contestants return to compete for a spot to join the 18 new contestants for a chance at redemption and to win the game. This season is the first season to air two times a week with the premiere occurring 29 August 2021 on RTL 4.

Contestants

Starting on 9 August 2021, contestants were announced via different ways, on different moments, via different challenges, with a total of 18 being announced before the season started airing. Then, at the end of episode 1, it was revealed that eight more contestants would be participating in a separate expedition. These 8 were returning players, who then were revealed all together via the Expeditie Robinson instagram page right after episode 1 finished airing. For the first time every, two separate expeditions were being played, also after the merge. This caused that 19 out of 26 players made the merge. Eventually the final 7 were reunited into one tribe on day 31.

Season Summary

Voting history

Days 1–17

Days 18–34

Notes

References

External links

Expeditie Robinson seasons
2021 Dutch television seasons